The Cotton Club was a club at 500 Jackson Avenue in the West Side of Las Vegas, Nevada, which was an exclusive club for African Americans.

History 
Established in late 1944 as a small bar by Moe Taub, it was one of the earliest Black clubs to legally operate away from Downtown Las Vegas. Sarann Knight-Preddy become a keno writer for the club, and in 1950 she became the first black woman to hold a gaming license in Nevada.

In July 1947 the Cotton Club was sold to Jodie Cannon, who resold it less than 6 months later to Uvalde Caperton, though Cannon stayed on as a manager. The original club was destroyed by an explosion and fire in May 1948. Caperton owned the club until 1957, when it closed.

Later Years
In 1969, Preddy put in a club with Margie Elliot called the Playhouse Lounge at the location. They were unable to obtain a gaming license and after a year, sold the business. It reopened from 1970 to 1985 as "Love's Cocktail Lounge".

References

Bibliography

Defunct nightclubs in the Las Vegas Valley
Defunct casinos in the Las Vegas Valley
1944 establishments in Nevada
1957 disestablishments in Nevada
West Las Vegas